Elizabeth the Queen was a 1930 Broadway three-act play written in blank verse by Maxwell Anderson, produced by the Theatre Guild, directed by Philip Moeller and with scenic and costume design by Lee Simonson. It ran for 147 performances from November 3, 1930, to March 1931 at the Guild Theatre. The starring roles were played by Lynn Fontanne as Elizabeth and Alfred Lunt as Lord Essex.	

It was adapted into a film The Private Lives of Elizabeth and Essex (1939) directed by Michael Curtiz and starring Bette Davis, Errol Flynn and Olivia de Havilland and a television movie, Elizabeth the Queen (1968) directed by George Schaefer and starring Judith Anderson and Charlton Heston.

On radio, it has been adapted four times: for NBC's "Great Plays" program on WJZ (May 7, 1939), with Mady Christians and Wesley Addy; on Matinee Theater (December 17, 1944) with Judith Evelyn and Victor Jory; on The Theatre Guild on the Air (December 2, 1945) with Lynn Fontanne and Alfred Lunt and on Best Plays (November 9, 1952) with Eva Le Gallienne.

Plot

The play revolves around the turbulent love affair between the aging Queen Elizabeth I of England and her much younger suitor Robert Devereux, 2nd Earl of Essex, who is ambitious for the throne.

Cast

 Lynn Fontanne as Elizabeth 	
 Alfred Lunt as Lord Essex	
 Mab Anthony as Mary
 Morris Carnovsky as Francis Bacon
 Percy Waram as Sir Walter Raleigh
 Robert Conness as Lord Burghley	
 Arthur Hughes as Sir Robert Cecil
 Whitford Kane as Burbage
 Phoebe Brand as Ellen
 Louise Huntington as a Lady-in-waiting
 Annabelle Williams as a Lady-in-waiting
 Royal Beal as	Marvel
 Barry Macollum as the fool
 Philip Foster as Captain Armin
 Edla Frankau as Tressa
 Anita Kerry as Penelope Gray
 Edward Oldfield as a captain of the guards
 Curtis Arnall as Poins, and as a courtier, a guard and a man-at-arms
 Charles Brokaw as a courier and as Heming
 Robert Caille as a courtier
 John Ellsworth as a man-at-arms
 Vincent Sherman as a herald

Multiple roles as Courtiers, Guards, Men-at-arms:
 Michael Borodin 
 James A. Boshell 
 Thomas Eyre
 George Fleming
 Perry King
 Henry Lase
 Guy Moore
 Stanley Ruth
 Nick Wiger
 James Wiley

References

 
The Private Lives of Elizabeth and Essex

External links 

 

Plays by Maxwell Anderson
1930 plays
Broadway plays
Plays set in England
Elizabeth I
American plays adapted into films